Syedna Qutub Khan Qutbuddin as-Shaheed was the 32nd Da'i al-Mutlaq of the Dawoodi Bohra. He succeeded Kasim Khan Zainuddin bin Feer Khan. He was the first Da'i to be martyred for his faith, and in a manner that resembles the martyrdom of Husayn ibn Ali, and so his burial place, Mazar-e-Qutbi, is referred to as Choti Karbala.

Family
His father was 27th Dai Syedna Dawood Bin Qutubshah, his mother's name was Raani Aai Saheba binte Ali bhai bin Jiva bhai. He had two brothers: 29th Dai Syedna Abduttayyeb Zakiuddin I, Miya Khan-ji and a sister called Habiba.

Early life 
Syedna Qutbuddin was born in Ahmedabad during the era of the 26th Dai, Dawood ibn Ajab Shah, on the night of 30th Dhu al-Qadah 985 AH. During his youth, he accompanied his father, the 27th Dai, Dawood Bin Qutubshah to Lahore to the court of the Mughal Emperor, Jalal-ud-din Akbar, during the fitnah of Sulayman bin Hassan. Akbar had summoned Qutub Shah to his court to address the dispute of succession raised by Sulayman, but ultimately issued a royal decree in Qutub Shah's favor.

Accession 
Qutbuddin was close-confidant to his  brother, the 29th Da'i, Abd al-Tayyib Zakiuddin I. After his brother's death, Qutbuddin continued to serve the 30th Da'i, Ali Shams al-Din IV, who was based in Yemen. Later, the 31st Da'i, Kasim Khan Zainuddin, appointed Qutbuddin as his Mazoon (second-in-command), and a while later, his Mansoos (successor).

Qutbuddin became Da'i al-Mutlaq in 1054 AH (1646 AD). He held the office for 1 year and 8 months before he was slain on the order of Aurangzeb, the Mughal governor of Gujarat, on the grounds of heresy.

Martyrdom 
In the month of Jumada al-Ula 1056 AH (1646 AD), false allegations of rafida (one who rejects the sunnat of Prophet Muhammad, introduces innovations viz. bidat, and practices exaggeration viz. ghulat), were made to Abdul Qawi (called Abdul Ghawi too), an office bearer of the governorate. On 28 Jumada al-Ula, Shah Beg arrested Qutbuddin and Feer Khan Shujauddin.

Qutbuddin and Shujauddin spent the next twenty days in prison, meanwhile, Abdul Qawi instructed his scholars to peruse books ceased from Qutbuddin's personal library but was unable to discern anything blasphemous or apostastic. On 21 Jumada al-Akhir, Qutbuddin was summoned to an audience in front of Aurangzeb where Abdul Qawi asked him to enter guilty plea and repent for his sins in exchange for pardon. Qutbuddin retorted, "I am not rafzi, nor were my forefathers. We are truly upon the sunnat of prophet Muhammad. I declare that there is no God but Allah and Muhammad is his messenger. I read the holy book, I offer daily prayers, give zakat, fast in the holy month of Ramadan, and perform hajj to the Bayt al-Allah. I am a Muslim. How is my blood legal for you to shed?"

Abdul Qawi had a group of elites from the city sign their names to a false confession (mehzara) under duress. The confession was introduced as evidence but the judge demanded an in-person testimonial. On 26 Jumada al-Akhir, Abdul Qawi summoned two children from Qutbuddin's household who confessed under the false-pretense that Qutbuddin would be released. The judge instead issued a death sentence.

On the morning of 27 Jumada al-Akhir 1056 H, Aurangzeb approved the execution order. Abdul Qawi had Shah Beg carry out the death sentence immediately.

Succession 
Qutbuddin was succeeded by Feer Khan Shujauddin. Mufaddal Saifuddin, the current Da'i al-Mutlaq, is from his progeny.

References

Further reading 
 Daftary, Farhad, The Ismaili, Their History and Doctrine(Chapter -Mustalian Ismailism-p. 300-310)
 Lathan, Young, Religion, Learning and Science
 Bacharach, Joseph W. Meri, Medieval Islamic Civilisation
 Luqmani, Ahmed Ismail. "A Short History of Fatemi Duaat"
 A short biography of Qutub Khan as-Shaheed

Dawoodi Bohra da'is
1578 births
1648 deaths
17th-century Ismailis
17th-century Islamic religious leaders